Norman S. Chamberlain (1887-1961) was an American painter. Two of his paintings are at the Smithsonian American Art Museum.

References

1887 births
1961 deaths
American male painters
Painters from California
20th-century American painters
20th-century American male artists

Public Works of Art Project artists

Treasury Relief Art Project artists